The following is a list of style sheet languages.

Standard
Cascading Style Sheets (CSS)
Document Style Semantics and Specification Language (DSSSL)
Extensible Stylesheet Language (XSL)

Non-standard
JavaScript Style Sheets (JSSS)
Formatting Output Specification Instance (FOSI)
Syntactically Awesome Stylesheets (Sass)
Less (Less)
Stylus
SMIL Timesheets

Stylesheet languages